Terry Wheatley (born July 28, 1960, in Saskatoon, Saskatchewan) is a Canadian former field hockey player who competed in the 1984 Summer Olympics.

References

External links
 

1960 births
Living people
Sportspeople from Saskatoon
Canadian male field hockey players
Olympic field hockey players of Canada
Field hockey players at the 1984 Summer Olympics